The 1955–56 New York Knicks season was the tenth season for the team in the National Basketball Association (NBA). In the regular season, the Knicks finished with a 35–37 record and tied for third place in the Eastern Division with the Syracuse Nationals. New York lost to the Nationals in a one-game playoff for a berth in the Eastern Division Semifinals.

NBA Draft

Note: This is not an extensive list; it only covers the first and second rounds, and any other players picked by the franchise that played at least one game in the league.

Regular season

Season standings

x – clinched playoff spot

Record vs. opponents

Game log

Division Tiebreaker
 Note: Tiebreaker games do not count as official playoff games.

|- align="center" bgcolor="#ffcccc"
| 1
| March 15
| @ Syracuse
| L 77–82
| Harry Gallatin (19)
| Ray Felix (13)
| Dick McGuire (9)
| Onondaga War Memorial
| 0–1
|-

References

External links
1955–56 New York Knickerbockers Statistics

New York Knicks seasons
New York
New York Knicks
New York Knicks
1950s in Manhattan
Madison Square Garden